The Märe is a mountain of the Bernese Alps, located on the border between the Swiss cantons of Fribourg and Bern. The Märe lies approximately halfway between Schwarzsee and Oberwil im Simmental.

References

External links
 Märe on Hikr

Mountains of the Alps
Mountains of Switzerland
Mountains of the canton of Bern
Mountains of the canton of Fribourg
Bern–Fribourg border
Two-thousanders of Switzerland